Aisha Akram also spelt Ayesha Akram is a former badminton player from Pakistan.

Career

National 
Akram is a two-time (2005, 2007) national champion. She represented National Bank of Pakistan domestically. In the 51st National badminton championship held at Rodham Hall, Islamabad in 2008, defending singles champion, Akram lost to Sara Khan in the final. Earlier in the semi-finals she had beaten Sara Mohmand, 21-17, 21-17. In the women's double, she reached the finals against Sara Mohmad and Sara Khan with her teammate, Palwasha Bashir. They beat Uzma Butt and  Saima Waqas of Wapda, 21-14 and 21-16 in the semi-finals.

International 

Akram has represented Pakistan internationally in singles, women's doubles and mixed doubles.

In 1995, she participated in singles (lost in round of 128), women's doubles with Zarina Jamal  (lost in round of 128) and mixed doubles with Islam Amir (lost in round of 64) events at the BWF World Championships held in Lausanne, Switzerland. Two years later (1997), she competed in the singles (lost in round of 64) and women's doubles with Asma Butt (lost in round of 32) qualification rounds at the BWF World Championships held in Glasgow, UK

In 2006, she competed at the South Asian Games held in Colombo, Sri Lanka. She won a bronze medal in the women's team event with Farzana Saleem, Saima Manzoor, Uzma Butt and Asma Butt.

In 2008, Akram won the mixed doubles title at the Syria International Series with Mohammad Attique.

In 2010, she participated in the women's doubles and mixed doubles events at the 11th South Asian Games held in Dhaka, Bangladesh. In women's doubles she partnered with Palwasha Bashir reaching the quarter-finals before falling to the Sri Lanka pair of Renu Chandrika de Silva Hettiarachchige  and Nadeesha Gayanthi M. by 8-21 and 17-21. In mixed doubles she partnered with Imran Mohib reaching the quarter-finals before losing to the Sri Lankan pair of Niluka Karunaratne and Renu Chandrika de Silva Hettiarachchige (7-21,20-22).

Events participated in:

 BWF World Championships, Lausanne, Switzerland - 1995
 Qualification rounds, BWF World Championships, Glasgow, UK - 1997
 Iran Fajr International - 2003
 Iran Fajr International - 2004
 Pakistan Satellite - 2004
 South Asian Games, Islamabad, Pakistan - 2004
 Iran Fajr International - 2005
 Nepal Satellite - 2005
 India Satellite - 2005
 South Asian Games, Colombo, Sri Lanka - 2006
 India International Challenge - 2007
 Pakistan International Challenge - 2007
 Syria International Series, Damascus , Syria - 2008
 Nepal International Series, Kathmandu, Nepal - 2008
 Iran Fajr International Series, Tehran, Iran - 2009
 South Asian Games, Dhaka, Bangladesh - 2010

Events entered but did not compete in:
 Asian Championships 1997
 US Open 1998

Achievements

BWF International Challenge/Series (1 title)
Mixed doubles

  BWF International Challenge tournament
  BWF International Series tournament
  BWF Future Series tournament

References 

Living people
Pakistani female badminton players
South Asian Games bronze medalists for Pakistan
South Asian Games medalists in badminton
Year of birth missing (living people)